Sergey Lavrenenko (born 15 May 1972) is a Kazakhstani former cyclist. A bronze medalist in the world points race championship in 1995, he also represented Kazakhstan in this competition at the 1996 and 2000 Summer Olympics. Also active on the road, he won the Tour of Turkey in 2000.

Major results

Road

1995
 1st Stage 4 Toer Report
 3rd Overall Tour of Turkey
1997
 7th Overall Tour de Langkawi
1998
 3rd Overall Tour d'Egypte
2000
 1st  Overall Tour of Turkey
1st Stage 1
 1st Stage 3 Tour d'Egypte
 1st Stage 3 Tour de Serbie
 2nd Overall Tour of Romania
2001
 1st Stage 2 Tour d'Egypte
 3rd Overall Tour of Turkey
1st Prologue
2003
 2nd National Time Trial Championships
2004
 1st Stage 6 Tour of Turkey
2005
 2nd Overall Tour d'Egypte
1st Prologue
2006
 1st Stage 5 Kerman Tour
 4th Overall Tour du Cameroun
1st Stage 7

Track
1995
 3rd Points race, World Track Championships
1998
 1st Points race, Asian Games
 2nd Team pursuit, Asian Games

References

External links
 

1972 births
Living people
Kazakhstani male cyclists
Olympic cyclists of Kazakhstan
Cyclists at the 1996 Summer Olympics
Cyclists at the 2000 Summer Olympics
Cyclists at the 1994 Asian Games
Cyclists at the 1998 Asian Games
Cyclists at the 2002 Asian Games
Asian Games medalists in cycling
Medalists at the 1994 Asian Games
Medalists at the 1998 Asian Games
Asian Games gold medalists for Kazakhstan
Asian Games silver medalists for Kazakhstan
People from Karaganda Region
Kazakhstani people of Russian descent
20th-century Kazakhstani people